The Marshall Fire was a destructive wildfire and urban conflagration that started on December 30, 2021, shortly after 11:00 a.m. MST, as a grass fire in Boulder County, Colorado. The fire killed two people and became the most destructive fire in Colorado history in terms of buildings destroyed.

Background factors 

An unusually wet spring with above average growth of grass due to moist conditions, followed by an unusually warm and dry summer and fall, created abundant dry grass. This, combined with the lack of snow so far that winter, created ideal weather conditions for wildfires.

Additionally, high winds were recorded in the area, with gusts of up to 115 miles per hour. The winds were driven by the mountain wave effect, and allowed for rapid spread of the fire. Effects of the high winds were also observed on the University of Colorado Boulder campus, where downed branches and trees were reported.

Cause 
On January 2, 2022, Boulder County Sheriff Joe Pelle reported that fire investigators identified a neighborhood by State Highway 93 and Marshall Road as the general area  containing the origin of the fire, but had not yet determined an exact origin or cause. The Boulder County Sheriff's Office also confirmed that deputies had received tips and executed a search warrant regarding the source of the fire.

The cause of the fire remains pending investigation.  However, an incident report filed by a ranger with Boulder Open Space and Mountain Parks identified two potential ignition points for the fire. The first potential ignition point was a shed at Highway 93 and 170 that began to burn at approximately 11:20AM MST, 30 December 2021. The shed was owned by Twelve Tribes, a controversial religious organization. In the days preceding the fire, Mountain View Fire and Rescue responded to a call to that property after a passerby reported a trash or grass fire.

The second potential ignition point was upwind from the first, and started around noon of the same day on "western side of the Marshall Mesa trailhead." Three weeks after the fire, underground fires in abandoned coal mines emerged as one possible source for the Marshall Mesa trailhead location.Months later, further investigation confirmed that there were two ignition sources for the fire that were a third of a mile and 40 minutes apart..

Fire progression 

The Marshall Fire was first reported to 911 on 30 December 2021 at the intersection of Colorado 93 and Marshall Road at 11:09 AM. The first firefighting unit, Mountain View Fire and Rescue engine 2209, arrived on scene at 11:12 AM. Boulder Open Space Ranger 5077 was already there. No fire was evident when they arrived, but a low hanging wire obstructed Marshall Road. Together, they closed Marshall Road.  Then seeing smoke, Engine 2209 moved south along a dirt road and discovered a small grass fire at 11:21 AM. Once the fire location was identified by the unit, high winds started to rapidly spread the fire. Three minutes after finding the fire, it was determined out of control and additional units were called to assist. At 11:44 the commander on site ordered the evacuation of residents 2 miles downwind of the fire. By noon the fire had reached the town of Superior, three miles to the east, prompting the evacuation of stores there. Within another hour evacuations had been ordered for tens of thousands of people starting with the town of Superior and later the cities of Louisville, portions of Broomfield, and unincorporated Boulder County. Other portions of Broomfield, along with portions of Lafayette, Arvada, and Westminster were issued pre-evacuation orders.

On the night of December 31 – January 1, heavy snowfall put an end to the fire.

Impacts 
In response to the fires, Governor Jared Polis declared a state of emergency around 3:15 p.m. MST on the day of the outbreak and ordered a ground delay at Denver International Airport. U.S. president Joe Biden responded to the fire by permitting the Federal Emergency Management Agency to assist. For those affected by the fires, Colorado Chamber President and CEO Loren Furman announced that the Colorado Chamber was united to help members and all local businesses and residents impacted by the fire. The Northwest Chamber Alliance created a website that centralized resources for businesses for federal and state aid, local resources, and donation information.

Casualties 
Eight burn injuries were confirmed in Boulder County.  One person, identified as Robert Sharpe, 69, was identified as killed. A woman identified as Nadine Turnbull, 91, is missing and presumed dead. Though over 1,000 pets are estimated to have perished, surprisingly only two horses, two goats and nine cows were killed. Even though much of the land burned was grazing land, dedicated rescuers save hundreds of other livestock.

Evacuations and closures 
Over thirty-seven thousand five hundred residents, employees and shoppers safely evacuated.  Ten evacuation notices were posted by Boulder County during the event.  The Colorado Department of Transportation closed multiple lanes and roadways as a result of crashes and the fires themselves; U.S. Route 36 was closed in both directions from Boulder to Broomfield and a portion of Colorado State Highway 470 was closed entirely near Morrison. Safety warnings were also issued for travelers on a stretch of Interstate 70 between Golden and Georgetown and Colorado State Highway 93 was temporarily closed for 40 minutes in the late morning.

Damage 
An estimated 1084 structures, including houses, a hotel and at least one shopping center, burned as a result of the Marshall Fire, and another 149 were damaged. Less than 12 hours after igniting, the fire surpassed the 2013 Black Forest Fire as the state's most destructive in terms of structures lost.  Later estimates place the total damage surpassing $2 billion.

Public Drinking Water Systems 
The fire damaged six public drinking water systems in the area. A case study was developed to better understand decisions, resources, expertise, and response limitations during and after the wildfire|url=https://doi.org/10.1002/aws2.1318[Access-date=2022-01-25|website=AWWA Water Science|language=en-US}}. The fire caused all water systems to lose power. Power loss was sometimes coupled with structure destruction, distribution depressurization, and the failure of backup power systems. These consequences jeopardized fire-fighting support and allowed for volatile organic compound and semi-volatile organic compound contamination of water distribution systems. Water system staff, with help from neighboring systems and external technical experts, stabilized the infrastructure, found and removed the contamination, and restored services. Actions were identified for utilities, governments, and researchers that could help communities minimize wildfire impacts, better protect workers and the population, and enable water systems to more rapidly respond and recover.

Gallery

See also 
 Weather of 2021
 2021 Colorado wildfires
 Weather of 2022
 2022 Colorado wildfires

References

2021 Colorado wildfires
2022 Colorado wildfires
2021 meteorology
2022 meteorology
2021 fire
December 2021 events in the United States
January 2022 events in the United States
Wildfires in Colorado